The Seattle Jr. Totems are a junior ice hockey team in Seattle, Washington. They are a member of the United States Premier Hockey League and play their home games at Olympic View Arena in Mountlake Terrace, Washington.

History
The franchise was founded in 2005 as the Kent Crusaders in the Northern Pacific Hockey League (NorPac). After one season the team was sold to another local youth hockey organization and was renamed after the former local professional team, the Seattle Totems.

Seattle finished the 2007–08 regular season first place overall in the NorPac and are three time Pacific Division Champions- 2007–08, 2008–09, and 2009–10.

Prior to the start of the 2012–13 season, the Totems joined the Western States Hockey League (WSHL), an AAU sanctioned league.

Season-by-season records

Alumni
The Jr. Totems have had a number of alumni move on to NCAA Division I, NCAA Division III, and higher levels of junior ice hockey and the NHL.

References

External links
The Seattle Jr. Totems' Official Web Site

Ice hockey in Seattle
Ice hockey teams in Washington (state)